Stictocephala alta is a species of treehopper in the family Membracidae.

References

External links

 

Membracidae
Insects described in 1851